Takydromus madaensis, the Ma Da grass lizard , is a species of lizard in the family Lacertidae. It is endemic to Vietnam.

References

Takydromus
Reptiles described in 2013
Endemic fauna of Vietnam
Reptiles of Vietnam
Taxa named by Vladimir V. Bobrov